There are an unknown number of indigenous deaf sign languages in Laos, which may have historical connections with the languages indigenous to Vietnam and Thailand, though it is not known if they are related to each other. There is no single "Laotian Sign Language". Sign languages in use in Laos include French Sign Language, American Sign Language, Thai Sign Language, Lao Sign Language (derived from FSL), and Home sign.

See also
 Thai Sign Language
 Vietnamese sign languages

References

Further reading
 Woodward, James (2000). Sign languages and sign language families in Thailand and Viet Nam, in Emmorey, Karen, and Harlan Lane, eds., The signs of language revisited : an anthology to honor Ursula Bellugi and Edward Klima. Mahwah, N.J.: Lawrence Erlbaum, p. 23-47
 Lao Deaf Unit
 Association for the Deaf (AFD)

Sign language isolates
Languages of Laos